The (dagger) indicates that the title was awarded posthumously to a soldier killed in action. This is a list of Heroes that were ethnic Kazakhs, not Russians that lived in the Kazakh SSR, repressed peoples deported to Kazakhstan, etc.

Military Personnel

Test Pilots

References

Heroes of the Soviet Union lists
Lists of Kazakhstani people